The Guatemalan National History Museum or Museo Nacional de Historia is a national museum in Guatemala City, Guatemala. The museum was founded in 1978.

References

Museums in Guatemala
Buildings and structures in Guatemala City
National museums
History museums in Guatemala